Liliya Stoyanova (born 19 November 1968) is a Bulgarian rower. She competed in the women's coxless four event at the 1992 Summer Olympics.

References

External links
 

1968 births
Living people
Bulgarian female rowers
Olympic rowers of Bulgaria
Rowers at the 1992 Summer Olympics
Rowers from Sofia